Anatoma orbiculata is a species of minute sea snail, a marine gastropod mollusc or micromollusc in the family Anatomidae.

References

 Geiger, D., 2012. - Monograph of the little slit shells. Volume 1. Introduction, Scissurellidae. pp. 1-728. Volume 2. Anatomidae, Larocheidae, Depressizonidae, Sutilizonidae, Temnocinclidae. pp. 729-1291. Santa Barbara Museum of Natural History Monographs: 1-728; 729-1291, sér. Number 7

External links
 To World Register of Marine Species

Anatomidae
Gastropods described in 2012